Kevin Kiner (born September 3, 1958) is an American film and television composer best known for scoring CSI: Miami, Star Wars: The Clone Wars, and Star Wars Rebels. Kiner was nominated for multiple Primetime Emmy, Daytime Emmy and Annie Awards for Clone Wars and Rebels, while winning several BMI Awards for his work on CSI: Miami, Narcos: Mexico, Making a Murderer, and Walker, Texas Ranger.

Career
Kiner was raised in Escondido, California, where his interest in music flourished through listening to different bands such as Yes, Pink Floyd, and the Eagles. After high school, Kiner attended the University of California, Los Angeles as a pre-medical student but later decided to pursue his passion for music instead. He then began traveling the world as a musical director for an international touring group before settling in Hollywood, where he began composing for film and television.

Filmography

Television

Film

Video games

Personal life
Kiner has two sons, Sean and Dean, who are also music composers.

References

External links
 
 

1958 births
Living people
20th-century American composers
20th-century American male musicians
21st-century American composers
21st-century American male musicians
American film score composers
American male film score composers
American television composers
Animation composers
Annie Award winners
Male television composers
Musicians from California
People from Escondido, California
Video game composers